The Château de Montpoupon (pronounced [ʃɑto də mɔ̃pupɔ̃]) is a castle in the commune of Céré-la-Ronde in the Indre-et-Loire département of France. It is located to the east of Tours, 10 km south of Montrichard in a forested valley.

History
Originally a mediaeval fortress, the castle was altered by the lords of Prie and Buzançais. The postern was constructed in the 16th century.

Since the middle of 19th century, the castle has belonged to the Motte Saint Pierre family. It houses one of the four French museums dedicated to hunting with dogs.

It has been listed since 1930 as a monument historique by the French Ministry of Culture.

See also
List of castles in France

References

External links

  
 

Castles in Centre-Val de Loire
Châteaux in Indre-et-Loire
Monuments historiques of Indre-et-Loire
Historic house museums in Centre-Val de Loire
Hunting museums
Museums in Indre-et-Loire